Emery Byrd Denny (November 23, 1892 – April 24, 1973) was an American jurist who served as an associate justice of the North Carolina Supreme Court from 1942 until 1962 and as chief justice of that court from 1962 until 1966.

Prior to his service on the court, he served as mayor of Gastonia from 1929 to 1937. In 1940, Denny managed the successful gubernatorial campaign of J. Melville Broughton and then served as chairman of the North Carolina Democratic Party.

In 1967, the retired chief justice chaired a state constitutional study commission, the work of which eventually led to the new Constitution of North Carolina of 1971.

Denny was a longtime supporter of Southeastern Baptist Theological Seminary, where a building was named in his honor.

References

Emery Byrd Denny Papers

1892 births
1973 deaths
Mayors of places in North Carolina
Chief Justices of the North Carolina Supreme Court
North Carolina Democratic Party chairs
People from Gastonia, North Carolina
20th-century American judges